"Jesus Christ Pose" is a song by the American rock band Soundgarden, released in 1991 as the first single from the band's third studio album, Badmotorfinger (1991). The song was included on Soundgarden's 1997 greatest hits album, A-Sides.

Origin and recording
"Jesus Christ Pose" features lyrics written by frontman Chris Cornell and music co-written by Cornell, drummer Matt Cameron, bassist Ben Shepherd, and guitarist Kim Thayil. Some see the song as defining the "essence" of Soundgarden, as it is credited to all four band members. Cameron said, "As soon as I played this pattern everyone dove right in, and within an hour we had the guts of the song. The approach we took on this one was pure assault of the senses. Canadians dance to this song."

According to a Rolling Stone interview, Kim Thayil explained the origin of this song:

Composition

Musically, "Jesus Christ Pose" has been described as grunge and alternative metal. It was performed in the key of D minor, with the guitars in drop D tuning, in 4/4 time at a tempo of 134 beats per minute. Regarding the song, Thayil said, "The song's groove reminds me of helicopter blades. I bent the strings at the beginning and end of the song." The band explained that the lyrics for "Jesus Christ Pose" concern the exploitation of religion for personal benefit. The song is a criticism of how public figures use religion, particularly the image of Jesus Christ, to portray themselves as being "better" than others, or as "martyrs". Chris Cornell specifically mentioned Jane's Addiction's frontman Perry Farrell as an influence on the song, explaining, "It became fashionable to be the sort of persecuted-deity guy." In an interview with Spin magazine in 1992, Cornell explained the term "Jesus Christ Pose":

Release and reception
"Jesus Christ Pose" was released as a single in 1991 in various versions with the previously unreleased B-sides "Stray Cat Blues" and "Into the Void (Sealth)". Outside the United States, the single was released commercially in the United Kingdom.

Greg Prato of AllMusic said, "In addition to Cornell's biting lyrics and vocals, the rest of the band helped fuel unquestionably one of Soundgarden's most vicious and venomous rockers. Breakneck guitar riffs do battle with sledgehammer drumming for most of the song's five minute and 50 seconds." Gina Arnold of Entertainment Weekly stated, "On songs like the cynical 'Jesus Christ Pose' ... Soundgarden sound a hell of a lot smarter than their peers, who seldom get beyond extolling booze, girls, and cars."

The song is featured on the soundtrack for the 1994 film, S.F.W. "Jesus Christ Pose" is available as downloadable content for the Rock Band series as a master track. A live performance of "Jesus Christ Pose" can be found on the "Black Hole Sun" single and the compilation album Telephantasm. A performance of the song is also included on the Motorvision home video release.

Music video
The music video for "Jesus Christ Pose" was directed by Eric Zimmerman, who would later direct the music video for "Rusty Cage". The video's intro adapts John 3:16; "And God So Loved Soundgarden He Gave Them His Only Song". The video features the band members wandering around a desert interspersed with various images of crosses, cyborgs, a crucified girl, a crucified skeleton and even vegetables crucified in human form. Thayil said, "A lot was chosen by the director Eric Zimmerman, and we checked it out and decided what we liked and didn't like." Cornell said, "It was a pretty unanimous decision by the band to have a woman being crucified in the video ... As a visual, it's powerful and it's also challenging to people, because women basically have been persecuted since before recorded history, and it would almost make more sense than seeing a man on it." He also added, "There's upside down crosses and right-side up ones. But there's certainly no blatant direction as far as religious conviction in the video."

Thayil said that the video was one of the few Soundgarden videos the band was satisfied with. He stated that "on the "Jesus Christ Pose" video we did a lot of experimenting at different kinda fun, cool things. I guess it seems fun to me because I didn't end up getting disappointed by it." The video was released in October 1991.

Controversy
"Jesus Christ Pose" garnered attention when MTV banned its corresponding music video in 1991—the channel has not shown it in its entirety since. The song and its video outraged many listeners, who perceived it as anti-Christian, resulting in the band receiving death threats because of it during a UK tour in the early 1990s. Thayil stated that the song and video "never got any airplay because of the references to Jesus. And MTV wouldn't play the video because they didn't like the idea of a girl on the cross. There are no guitars in the video at all. There's not even a picture of a guitar in the video. It's like this hard, rock-fast, punk-metal video that has no instruments in the whole thing. And it's a six minute video!" Cornell additionally attributed the video's lack of airtime due to its length, comparing MTV's programming at the time to that of a commercial radio station.

Track listing
Promotional CD (US) and 12" vinyl (UK)
"Jesus Christ Pose" (Matt Cameron, Chris Cornell, Ben Shepherd, Kim Thayil) – 5:51

12" vinyl (UK)
"Jesus Christ Pose" (Cameron, Cornell, Shepherd, Thayil) – 5:51
"Stray Cat Blues" (Mick Jagger, Keith Richards) – 4:46

12" vinyl (UK), CD (UK), and 12" vinyl (UK)
"Jesus Christ Pose" (Cameron, Cornell, Shepherd, Thayil) – 5:51
"Stray Cat Blues" (Jagger, Richards) – 4:46
"Into the Void (Sealth)" (Chief Sealth, Ozzy Osbourne, Tony Iommi, Geezer Butler, Bill Ward) – 6:37
"Somewhere" (Shepherd) – 4:21

Promotional 7" vinyl (US) and promotional 12" vinyl (US)
"Jesus Christ Pose" (Cameron, Cornell, Shepherd, Thayil) – 5:51
"Drawing Flies" (Cameron, Cornell) – 2:25

Chart positions

Accolades
The information regarding accolades attributed to "Jesus Christ Pose" is adapted in part from Acclaimed Music.

* denotes an unordered list

References

External links

 [ Review of "Jesus Christ Pose"] at Allmusic

1991 singles
Soundgarden songs
Music video controversies
Song recordings produced by Chris Cornell
Song recordings produced by Matt Cameron
Song recordings produced by Terry Date
Songs written by Chris Cornell
Songs written by Matt Cameron
Songs written by Ben Shepherd
Songs critical of religion
Cultural depictions of Jesus
Songs about Jesus
1991 songs
Songs written by Kim Thayil
A&M Records singles